Puthukavithai is a Tamil language romantic drama film, directed by S. P. Muthuraman. The film was a remake of the 1976 Kannada film Naa Ninna Mareyalare.

Plot 
Anand is a motorcycle contest champion for six years in a row. Winning the championship brings introduces him to Uma, who is the daughter of a haughty, rich woman called Thilakavathy.

Initially, Uma thinks Anand has too dark a complexion; but soon her feelings turn into love. Thilakavathy deceives Anand and Uma into thinking that she had agreed to their wedding; while secretly planning to get Uma married to someone else.

On the day of the wedding, she gets Anand locked up. Anand escapes, but not too soon to stop the wedding.

The next time they meet, Uma sees Anand seemingly happily married to Kalyani and with a child studying in the second standard. Uma mentions that she is happily married too, and has two children.

Meanwhile, Kalyani invites Uma to her house for Diwali festival celebrations, where she reveals a secret.

Actually, Kalyani is not married to Anand, but to someone else. Further, Kalyani and her husband have actually saved Anand who was lying drunk on a road. So Anand stayed with them and their child.

Meanwhile, Anand discovers that Uma is a widow now and that she had lied to him about having kids and being happily married.

Anand promises to marry Uma and finally they reunite.

Cast 
 Rajinikanth as Anand
 Jyothi as Uma
 Sukumari as Thilakavathy
 Saritha as Kalyani
 Atlanta Ganesh as Ganesh
 Thengai Srinivasan as Samynadha, Anand's uncle
 Poornam Viswanathan as Uma's father-in-law
 I. S. R. as Servant of Thilakavathy
 Srilekha Rajendran

Soundtrack 
Music was composed by Ilaiyaraaja. The song "Vellai Pura Onru" is set to Hamsadhvani raga.

References

External links 
 

1980s Tamil-language films
1982 films
1982 romantic drama films
Films directed by S. P. Muthuraman
Films scored by Ilaiyaraaja
Films with screenplays by Visu
Indian romantic drama films
Tamil remakes of Kannada films